The 163rd New York State Legislature, consisting of the New York State Senate and the New York State Assembly, met from January 8, 1941, to April 24, 1942, during the ninth and tenth years of Herbert H. Lehman's governorship, in Albany.

Background
Under the provisions of the New York Constitution of 1894, re-apportioned in 1917, and amended in 1937, 51 Senators and 150 assemblymen were elected in single-seat districts for two-year terms. The senatorial districts consisted either of one or more entire counties; or a contiguous area within a single county. The counties which were divided into more than one senatorial district were New York (nine districts), Kings (eight), Bronx (three), Erie (three), Monroe (two), Queens (two) and Westchester (two). The Assembly districts were made up of contiguous area, all within the same county.

At this time there were two major political parties: the Democratic Party and the Republican Party. The American Labor Party endorsed the whole Democratic ticket, which included one Republican judge  of the Court of Appeals. The Prohibition Party also nominated a ticket.

Elections
The New York state election, 1940, was held on November 5.  All six statewide elective offices were carried by the nominees on the Democratic-American Labor fusion ticket. The approximate party strength at this election, as gathered from the results, was: Democrats 2,843,000; Republicans 2,837,000; American Labor 365,000; and Prohibition 5,000.

All three women legislators—State Senator Rhoda Fox Graves (Rep.), of Gouverneur; and Assemblywomen Jane H. Todd (Rep.), of Tarrytown, and Edith C. Cheney (Rep.), of Corning—were re-elected.

The New York state election, 1941, was held on November 4. Two vacancies in the State Senate and two vacancies in the State Assembly were filled.

On March 10, 1942, Mary A. Gillen, the widow of Assemblyman Michael J. Gillen, was elected to the seat previously held by her husband.

Sessions
The Legislature met for the first regular session (the 164th) at the State Capitol in Albany on January 8, 1941; and adjourned at 2.30 a.m. on April 4.

Oswald D. Heck (Rep.) was re-elected Speaker.

Joe R. Hanley (Rep.) was re-elected Temporary President of the State Senate.

On December 7, 1941, happened the Attack on Pearl Harbor, and the United States entered World War II. Subsequently, some legislators resigned their seats to join the armed forces, among them Robert F. Wagner, Jr., Phelps Phelps, Francis E. Dorn and Henry J. Latham.

The Legislature met for the second regular session (the 165th) at the State Capitol in Albany on January 7, 1942; and adjourned on April 24.

State Senate

Districts

Members
The asterisk (*) denotes members of the previous Legislature who continued in office as members of this Legislature. Francis J. McCaffrey Jr and Charles O. Burney Jr changed from the Assembly to the Senate at the beginning of this Legislature. Assemblymen Carmine J. Marasco and William Kirnan were elected to fill vacancies in the Senate.

Note: For brevity, the chairmanships omit the words "...the Committee on (the)..."

Employees
 Clerk: William S. King
 Assistant Clerk: Fred J. Slater
 Sergeant-at-Arms: Harold W. Cole
 Assistant Sergeant-at-Arms: Henry Whitbeck
 Principal Doorkeeper: Lynn Corman
 Assistant Doorkeeper: Irving Hoag
 Stenographer: John K. Marshall

State Assembly

Assemblymen

Note: For brevity, the chairmanships omit the words "...the Committee on (the)..."

Employees
 Clerk: Ansley B. Borkowski
 Sergeant-at-Arms: Richard Schnor
 First Assistant Doorkeeper: Joseph G. Bates
 Second Assistant Doorkeeper: M. C. Mansolillo
 Stenographer: Walter F. Berry

Notes

Sources
 Your Representatives in the Legislature and in Congress; Legislature for 1941–1942 in The State Employee (November 1940, Vol. 9, No. 8, pg. 264f)
 Members of the New York Senate (1940s) at Political Graveyard
 Members of the New York Assembly (1940s) at Political Graveyard
 GOP LEGISLATORS RETAIN LEADERS in the Daily Sentinel, of Rome, on January 8, 1941

163
1941 in New York (state)
1942 in New York (state)
1941 U.S. legislative sessions
1942 U.S. legislative sessions